Sacred Ground is an album by American jazz drummer Whit Dickey recorded in 2004 and released on the Portuguese Clean Feed label. Dickey leads a quartet with Roy Campbell on trumpet, Rob Brown on alto sax and Joe Morris on double bass instead of his usual guitar, the same lineup as the previous album Coalescence.

Reception 

The All About Jazz by Scott Convery observes that "the sound is anything but traditional. The melodies are short and complex and bring to mind the precision of Frank Zappa or Henry Threadgill."

Track listing 

All compositions by Whit Dickey
 "Vortex" – 7:15
 "Soldier of Uncertainty" – 12:09 
 "Sacred Ground" – 8:38
 "Vital Transmission" – 11:18 
 "Dream of Caravans" – 7:09

Personnel 

Roy Campbell – trumpet
Rob Brown – alto sax
Joe Morris – double bass
Whit Dickey – drums

References 

2006 albums
Whit Dickey albums
Clean Feed Records albums